Manfred Stengl (April 1, 1946 – June 6, 1992) was an Austrian luger.

Stengl was born in Salzburg. He worked as a road-building engineer.

He won the gold medal in the men's doubles event at the 1964 Winter Olympics in Innsbruck. Stengl also won the silver medal in the men's doubles event at the 1962 FIL European Luge Championships in Weissenbach, Austria.

In the 1970s, Stengl turned his attention to bobsleigh, winning a bronze in the four-man event at the 1975 FIBT World Championships in Cervinia, Italy.

Stengl was also active in motorcycle racing, participating in many events from the late 1960s and until his death.

He died in a motorcycle accident during the 1992 Isle of Man TT while competing in the Senior TT category.

References

1939 births
1992 deaths
Austrian male bobsledders
Austrian male lugers
Olympic lugers of Austria
Olympic gold medalists for Austria
Austrian motorcycle racers
Isle of Man TT riders
Lugers at the 1964 Winter Olympics
Motorcycle racers who died while racing
Sport deaths in the Isle of Man
Olympic medalists in luge
Medalists at the 1964 Winter Olympics
Sportspeople from Salzburg